The 1975–76 Hamburger SV season was the 29th season in the club's history and the 13th consecutive season playing in the Bundesliga. Hamburg competed in this season's editions of the Bundesliga, DFB-Pokal, and UEFA Cup.

The season is generally considered as the start of Hamburg's golden era of the most successful period in club history. On 26 June 1976, HSV won the DFB-Pokal, defeating 1. FC Kaiserslautern 2–0 in the final with first-half goals from Peter Nogly and Ole Bjørnmose. In the league, HSV finished as runners-up and they also reached the semi-finals of the UEFA Cup, being eliminated by Club Brugge.

Winning the DFB-Pokal secured Hamburg a place in next season's European Cup Winners' Cup.

Competitions

Overall record

Bundesliga

League table

DFB Pokal

Results

UEFA Cup

Results

References

Hamburger SV seasons
Hamburger